Fiorella Mari (born 21 June 1928) is a Brazilian-born Italian former actress.

Life and career
Born in São Paulo, Brazil as Fiorella Colpi by Italian parents, the daughter of a surgeon, Mari soon moved to Rome where in the 1950s she made her acting debut using the American surname of her husband of the time (Jess Maxwell, from whom she divorced almost immediately).  She later adopted the stage name Mari and appeared in a number of stage plays, radio programs, television films and films. She is probably best known for her roles in Camillo Mastrocinque's Are We Men or Corporals? (1955) and in Mario Monicelli's Fathers and Sons (1957). In 1957 Mari hosted the Sanremo Music Festival alongside Nunzio Filogamo and Marisa Allasio; a short time later she retired from showbusiness.

Selected filmography
 Queen Margot (1954)

References

External links 
 

Italian film actresses
Italian television actresses
20th-century Italian actresses
People from São Paulo
Italian stage actresses
1928 births
Possibly living people
Brazilian emigrants to Italy